Spanish tenor Plácido Domingo has sung 151 roles in Italian, French, German, English, Spanish and Russian. His main repertoire however is Italian (Otello, Cavaradossi in Tosca, Don Carlo, Des Grieux in Manon Lescaut, Dick Johnson in La fanciulla del West, Radames in Aida), French (Faust, Werther, Don José in Carmen, Samson in Samson et Dalila), and German (Lohengrin, Parsifal, and Siegmund in Die Walküre). Domingo currently continues to add more operas to his repertoire. Since 2009, he has moved substantially into the baritone repertoire, especially focusing on Verdi baritone roles. In 2015, he made his most recent debuts as Macbeth at the Berlin State Opera, Don Carlo in Ernani at the Metropolitan Opera, and Gianni Schicchi at the Los Angeles Opera. Tim Page, a Pulitzer Prize-winner for music criticism, described Domingo in a 1996 Washington Post article as "the most versatile, intelligent and altogether accomplished operatic tenor now before the public".

Domingo's official repertoire list includes all of his operatic roles on stage and recordings, as well as his zarzuela and operetta debuts made in opera houses and on recordings since his operatic debut on 23 September 1959. One exception to this is Arturo in Donizetti's opera Lucia di Lammermoor, in which he made his role debut on 28 October 1961 in Guadalajara, Mexico, and his U.S. operatic debut on 16 November of the same year at Dallas Civic Opera in Dallas, Texas. The only other exception is his performance as Antonio in Cano's modern opera, Luna, in which he appeared on an abridged recording in 1997 and in a concert performance at the Palau de la Música de València on 15 May 1998.

The official list does not include his previous roles in zarzuelas or musicals with his parents' company or theaters in Mexico prior to September 1959, nor does it include his performance as the Spanish painter Francisco Goya in the musical, Goya: A Life in Song, which he recorded in both English and Spanish-language versions. It also contains only a fraction of his sung symphonic works, excluding his performances of the tenor parts in Verdi and Andrew Lloyd Webber's Requiems and Beethoven's Ninth Symphony, Missa Solemnis, and Christus am Ölberge, among others. Some small parts sung during the same performance are listed as only one role. Danilo in The Merry Widow is listed twice: once together with Camille in a Spanish-language translation early in his career and later alone in English translation at the Metropolitan Opera. Domingo alternated the parts of Camille and Danilo during his first run of the operetta at the Palacio de Bellas Artes in 1960.

Role debuts
These lists are sortable, e.g. by opera title, composer, location, or date. Operas and other works, in which Domingo appeared in world premieres, are marked in bold. All roles are tenor parts except where noted.

Official repertoire

Additional roles (partial)

Major opera house and festival debuts

See also

 Plácido Domingo discography
 The Three Tenors
 Christmas in Vienna I, II, III, and VI
 Grammy Award for Best Opera Recording
 :Category:Plácido Domingo albums

References

External links
 "I must live up to what people expect" by Peter Conrad, The Observer, 10 July 2005
 Profile at the Kennedy Center
 "A tenor no more: Domingo to make switch to baritone" by Martin Kettle, The Guardian, 25 January 2007

Opera-related lists
Plácido Domingo albums